Edit Kovács may refer to:

 Edit Kovács (fencer), Hungarian fencer
 Edit Kovács (swimmer), Hungarian swimmer